Essential amino acids (EAAs) are amino acids that are necessary to build proteins in an organism. The source of complete EAAs are both animal and plant-based food.

Essential amino acids in plant food 
Essential amino acids (EAAs) are amino acids which are necessary to build proteins in an organism but can not be synthesized by the organism itself and as such must be provided in the diet. In case of humans there are 9 EAAs: histidine, isoleucine, leucine, lysine, methionine, phenylalanine, threonine, tryptophan, and valine.

The source of complete EAAs are both animal and plant-based food. The content of EAAs in plants vary as there is a huge variety of plants. Looking at EAAs content in foods, in general plants have much lower content of proteins than animal food. Some of the plant-based foods do not contain a large quantity EAAs for example: some sprouts, mango, pineapple, lime and melon. Rich in proteins are all kinds of nuts, seeds, beans and peas. The composition of EAAs in selected plant foods as well recommended dietary allowances (RDA) are shown in the table below.

1Chicken was chosen as it is the most eaten animal food and it has one of the highest amount of EAAs among animal-based foods.

Soybeans have the highest content of EAAs among the foods. Spirulina is a superior supplement containing the highest amount of EAAs. Another important factor is the composition of EAAs. As we can see the quantity of some EAAs is lower. For example, pumpkin seeds despite high total EAAs content have a low content of lysine. A good indication is to calculate the food sample that meets the WHO's requirement of EAAs intake. A table below shows the smallest sample food required to provide all EAAs according to the RDA for each individual EAA.

Soybeans have the smallest sample food that provide complete protein, smaller than for several animal foods. Food samples for nuts, seeds, beans, and peas are bigger than one of chicken, and in case of rice, the sample is simply unpractical - the known fact is that cereals are not the main source of proteins.

External links 

 "How Much Protein Do You Need?", The Game Changers
 "In Vitro assessment of the nutritive value of expanded soybean meal for dairy cattle", Journal
 "Soy", MedlinePlus
 "The Bigger Picture", The Game Changers

References 

Essential amino acids
Nutrition
Vegetarianism